Kaya is a drama television series that first aired on MTV on October 22, 2007. The show was cancelled after its first season ended.

Premise
The series focuses on Kaya (Danielle Savre) and her band and what happens to their lives after they become overnight rock stars.

Cast

Main
 Danielle Savre as Kaya
 Mike Dopud as Don Lawson
 Cory Monteith as Gunnar
 Justin Wilczynski as Taylor
 Joe MacLeod as Manny
 Alexia Fast as Kristin
 Jessica Parker Kennedy as Natalee
 Robert Moloney as Rossi

Recurring
 Lynda Boyd as Ellie
 Eric Benet as T. Davis
 Christy Carlson Romano as Kat
 Kirsten Kilburn as Stephanie

Episodes

References

External links
 

2000s American teen drama television series
2000s Canadian teen drama television series
2007 American television series debuts
2007 Canadian television series debuts
2007 American television series endings
2007 Canadian television series endings
MTV original programming
Citytv original programming
Television series about teenagers
Television shows filmed in Vancouver
English-language television shows